West Brooklyn is a community in the Canadian province of Nova Scotia, located in  Kings County .

References
 West Brooklyn on Destination Nova Scotia

Communities in Kings County, Nova Scotia